Chiara Di Iulio (born 5 May 1985) is an Italian volleyball player. She was part of the Italy women's national volleyball team at the 2010 FIVB Volleyball Women's World Championship in Japan. and 2011 Montreux Volley Masters. She played with Chateau d'Ax Urbino Volley, at the 2010–11 Women's CEV Cup.

Clubs
2003-2006 Colussi Sirio Perugia
2006-2007 Scavolini Pesaro
 2010-2011  Chateau d'Ax Urbino Volley 
2012  Volley Bergamo
2014 Azeryol Baku
2015  Nordmeccanica Piacenza	
 2019  Vakıfbank S.K.

References

External links 
 

1985 births
Living people
Italian women's volleyball players
Mediterranean Games bronze medalists for Italy
Mediterranean Games medalists in volleyball
Competitors at the 2013 Mediterranean Games
Serie A1 (women's volleyball) players
20th-century Italian women
21st-century Italian women